The Fundación Cinemateca Nacional de Venezuela (Spanish: Foundation National Cinematheque of Venezuela) is a Venezuelan public institution founded on May 4, 1966 by Margot Benacerraf and since then is dedicated to presenting classics of world cinema to Venezuelan public.

Headquarters are at Centro Simón Bolívar Towers.

Cinemas in Venezuela